Rodolfo Freitas da Silva (born 4 October 1993), simply known as Rodolfo, is a Brazilian footballer who plays as a forward for Rio Preto.

References

External links

Rodolfo at ZeroZero

1993 births
Living people
Brazilian footballers
Brazilian expatriate footballers
Association football forwards
Campeonato Brasileiro Série A players
Campeonato Brasileiro Série B players
USL Championship players
Sociedade Esportiva Palmeiras players
Rio Claro Futebol Clube players
Esporte Clube XV de Novembro (Piracicaba) players
Oeste Futebol Clube players
Ypiranga Futebol Clube players
Associação Portuguesa de Desportos players
Fresno FC players
Atlanta United 2 players
Rio Preto Esporte Clube players
Expatriate soccer players in the United States
Brazilian expatriate sportspeople in the United States